Penaherreraus pradosiae is a species of beetle in the family Cerambycidae. It was described by Tavakilian and Peñaherrera-Leiva in 2003.

References

Acanthoderini
Beetles described in 2003